Tim Carpenter (born July 24, 1980) is an American mixed martial artist who last competed in 2012.

Background
Carpenter was born in West Chester, Pennsylvania; the youngest of five kids. His father was a
public school social studies teacher and his mother worked at West Chester University. He was a very fat child and teenager growing up. At the age of 15 he began training in judo under PA State Champion Joe Condello who was one of Ishikawa sensei's top American students. Through his training in judo he began to lose weight and get in shape and began to compete in Judo competitions. He went on to become one of the top ranked junior judo athletes in the country placing second in the '97 USJI high school nationals, first in the '98 USJI National Junior Olympic championships, first place in the '98 Pa State Championship. His success in competition earned him an opportunity to train for a short time at the US olympic training center, living and training with some of the top athletes in the world.

Mixed martial arts career

Judo and Jiu-Jistu
In 1997 he began training in Gracie Jiu Jitsu under Steve Maxwell and Phil Migliarese at Maxercise in Philadelphia. Maxercise was one of the first Gracie Jiu Jitsu academies in the nation and was frequently visited by Gracie family members, notably Royce, Rorion, Relson, as well as many of their top instructors. Tim was awarded his blue belt in Gracie Jiu Jitsu by Royce Gracie after attending a seminar in Philadelphia and Royce watching him roll 
with several more advanced students after only 4 months of training in jiu-jitsu. When Maxercise closed Tim became a member of Team Balance under Relson Gracie black belt Phil Migliarese. He was one of the original instructors at Balance Headquarters for several years as well as one of the top competitors for the team winning numerous grappling and Jiu Jitsu titles including:

2004 purple belt Pan American Jiu Jitsu Champion

2004 Arnold World Gracie Jiu Jitsu Champion Purple belt

2004 IBJJF US National Silver Medalist

2005 IBJJF Brown Belt USA vs. Brazil Champion 

2005 Arnold World Gracie Jiu Jitsu Champion Brown Belt

2005 Gracie Worlds Submission Wrestling Champion

Multiple Time Grapplers Quest Champion 

NAGA Champion

2007 Abu Dhabi Submission Wrestling world Championship Invitee and Semi Finalist

After years of competing in and winning some of the top Jiu Jitsu and Grappling competitions on the planet Tim was awarded his black belt in Gracie Jiu Jitsu from Phil Migliarese and Relson Gracie.

Early MMA career
After receiving his black belt, Tim decided to pursue a career in MMA. He went undefeated in his first seven fights, winning the light heavyweight title for two separate organizations, and both the Sportfighting and Combat in the Cage light heavyweight belts belonged to Tim.

Bellator
Despite being undefeated in his first seven fights, he did not have an easy path. He fought and defeated three world class BJJ blackbelts including Guybson Sa, fellow American BJJ phenom Jamal Patterson, and Daniel Gracie.

His victory over Jamal Patterson in Bellator 33 earned him a slot in the very first Bellator LHW tournament against Patterson's team mate and BJJ Blackbelt world champion Daniel Gracie. 
The fight lasted all three rounds, with Tim Carpenter dominating both the striking and grappling, scoring several knockdowns and close submission attempts on the Brazilian and earning him a hard fought decision victory and advancing to the next round of the tournament where he suffered an early stoppage loss to Christian M’pumbu.

Carpenter rebounded from this loss with a spectacular highlight reel Knockout victory over MMA veteran and D-1 wrestler Ryan Contaldi at Bellator 54.

His next fight saw him fighting in the second Bellator LHW tournament, Bellator 71. Carpenter won the fight via armbar submission in the second round. He was scheduled for an 
undercard fight against the durable John Hawk, but earned a spot as a last minute replacement 
when Richard Hale failed to make weight.

He took on the hard hitting former heavyweight Beau Tribolet. He dominated the action in the first round before weathering a storm of hard punches in the second round to secure a text book armbar from the guard and earning a submission victory with only seconds left on the clock.

His next fight was a decision loss to hulking American wrestler Travis Wiuff.

After his last fight, Carpenter decided to retire from MMA and open his own martial arts academy in order to share his knowledge with others. In his time as an instructor, coach, and mentor, he has helped countless people improve their lives and pursue their dreams through the martial arts. He has produced BJJ world champions, and successful grappling competitors, along with professional and amateur MMA fighters.

His academy, Hellfish Mixed Martial Arts is not focused on producing cage fighters, but rather on helping people improve their lives through training in the martial arts.

Mixed martial arts record

|-
| Loss
|align=center| 9–2
| Travis Wiuff
|Decision (unanimous)
| Bellator 72
|
|align=center| 3
|align=center| 5:00
| Tampa, Florida, United States
|
|-
| Win
|align=center| 9–1
| Beau Tribolet
|Submission (armbar)
| Bellator 71
|
|align=center| 2
|align=center| 4:51
| Chester, West Virginia, United States
|
|-
| Win
|align=center| 8–1
| Ryan Contaldi
| TKO (punch)
| Bellator 54
| 
|align=center| 1
|align=center| 2:16
| Atlantic City, New Jersey, United States
|
|-
| Loss
|align=center| 7–1
| Christian M'Pumbu
| TKO (punches)
| Bellator 42
| 
|align=center| 1
|align=center| 2:08
| Concho, Oklahoma, United States
| 
|-
| Win
|align=center| 7–0
| Daniel Gracie
| Decision (split)
| Bellator 38
| 
|align=center| 3
|align=center| 5:00
| Tunica, Mississippi, United States
| 
|-
| Win
|align=center| 6–0
| Jamal Patterson
| Decision (split)
| Bellator 33
| 
|align=center| 3
|align=center| 5:00
| Philadelphia, Pennsylvania, United States
| 
|-
| Win
|align=center| 5–0
| Guybson Sa
| Decision (unanimous)
| Matrix Fights 2
| 
|align=center| 3
|align=center| 5:00
| Philadelphia, Pennsylvania, United States
| 
|-
| Win
|align=center| 4–0
| Rich Lictawa
| Decision (unanimous)
| Adrenaline: New Breed
| 
|align=center| 3
|align=center| 5:00
| Atlantic City, New Jersey, United States
| 
|-
|  Win
|align=center| 3–0
| Sean McCann
| Submission (triangle choke)
| CITC: Fearless Fighters Return
| 
|align=center| 1
|align=center| 1:43
| Trenton, New Jersey, United States
| 
|-
| Win
|align=center| 2–0
| Dale Carson
| Submission (armbar)
| SportFighting 4: Battle for the Belts
| 
|align=center| 2
|align=center| 1:27
| Morristown, New Jersey, United States
|
|-
| Win
|align=center| 1–0
| Jonathan Helwig
| Submission (triangle armbar)
| Sportfighting 2
| 
|align=center| 1
|align=center| 4:46
| Hoboken, New Jersey, United States
|

References

External links 
 
Tim Carpenter MMA record from Sherdog

1980 births
Living people
American male mixed martial artists
Light heavyweight mixed martial artists
Mixed martial artists utilizing judo
Mixed martial artists utilizing Brazilian jiu-jitsu
Sportspeople from Philadelphia
American male judoka
American practitioners of Brazilian jiu-jitsu
People awarded a black belt in Brazilian jiu-jitsu